Theodoros "Thodoris" Zaras (Greek: Θεόδωρος "Θοδωρής" Ζάρας; born August 12, 1987) is a Greek professional basketball player for Lavrio of the Greek Basket League. He is a 6 ft 5 in (1.97 m) tall swingman.

Youth career
Zaras played youth club basketball with AO Stavroupolis, before he started his pro career.

Professional career
Some of the clubs that Zaras has played with during his pro career include: ICBS, AEL 1964, Kolossos, Kavala, and KAOD. He joined Aris Thessaloniki in the summer of 2015. He officially signed with PAOK on June 27, 2017. On August 9, 2019, Zaras signed with the third Thessaloniki Greek Basket League club, Iraklis. 

On August 13, 2020, Zaras agreed to return to Kolossos Rodou after ten years. During the 2020-21 season, Zaras averaged a career high 11 points, 1.9 rebounds, and 2 assists, playing 25 minutes per game. He ranked 4th in three-point shooting (40/83, 48.2% from beyond the arc) in the Greek Basket League and 1st amongst all the native players. 

On August 4, 2021, Zaras moved to Larisa. In 30 league games, he averaged 8.5 points (shooting with 42.2% from the 3-point line), 1.3 rebounds and 1.6 assists, playing around 22 minutes per contest.

On September 16, 2022, Zaras signed with Lavrio.

During his pro career, Zaras has played in Greece's top league, the Greek Basket League, as well as in both European-wide secondary leagues, the EuroCup and the FIBA Champions League.

References

External links
EuroCup Profile
FIBA Champions League Profile
Eurobasket.com Profile
Draftexpress.com Profile
ProBallers.com Profile
Greek Basket League Profile 
Greek Basket League Profile 
RealGM.com Profile

1987 births
Living people
A.E.L. 1964 B.C. players
Aris B.C. players
Greek men's basketball players
ICBS B.C. players
Iraklis Thessaloniki B.C. players
K.A.O.D. B.C. players
Kavala B.C. players
Kolossos Rodou B.C. players
Larisa B.C. players
Lavrio B.C. players
P.A.O.K. BC players
Shooting guards
Small forwards
Basketball players from Thessaloniki